Matterson is a surname. Notable people with the surname include:

 Donald Matterson (1953/1954 – 1972), American bank robber
 Frank Matterson (1904–1980), Australian rugby player
 Garth John Matterson, for whom Matterson Inlet was named
 Neil Matterson (rower) (d. 1933), Australian professional sculler
 Ryan Matterson (b. 1994), Australian rugby player
 Terry Matterson (born 1967 in Auburn, New South Wales), Australian rugby league football coach and player

English-language surnames